Joshua Kushner (born June 12, 1985) is an American billionaire businessman, heir, and investor. He is the founder and managing partner of the venture capital firm Thrive Capital, co-founder of Oscar Health, and the son of billionaire real estate developer Charles Kushner. His brother is Jared Kushner, the son-in-law and former senior advisor to former U.S. President Donald Trump. He is a minority owner of the Memphis Grizzlies.

Early life & education
Kushner grew up in a Jewish family in Livingston, New Jersey to Charles and Seryl Kushner. Kushner graduated from Harvard College in 2008, and from Harvard Business School in 2011.

Career

Early career 
During his sophomore year, Kushner was founding executive editor of Scene, a new student-publication that aimed to be "Harvard's version of Vogue and Vanity Fair". According to The Harvard Crimson, the Scene faced criticism upon its release due to a supposed inaccurate portrayal of the Harvard community.

In the spring of his junior year, with two graduate students he pooled $10,000 to found social network Vostu, which aimed to "fill a void left by online communities in which English is the lingua franca", like Facebook. According to Kushner, Latin America was a promising market for a Facebook-alternative and new social networking site because "[it was] a place where Internet use is increasing every year, and technology is booming at a rapid pace". Vostu laid off the majority of its employees in 2013 and significantly scaled back its operations after a copyright lawsuit from a competitor accused them of copying games.

The year after graduation, he also co-founded a start-up called Unithrive. Unithrive was inspired by the peer-to-peer loan model of Kiva, but aimed to "ease the crisis in paying for college" by matching "alumni lenders to cash-strapped students ... who [could] post photographs and biographical information and request up to $2,000", interest-free for repayment within five years of graduation. After graduating from Harvard, he started his career in the private equity arm at Goldman Sachs, working for a year on distressed debt.

Thrive Capital

He founded Thrive Capital in 2009, a venture capital firm that focuses on media and internet investments. Since its founding, Thrive has raised $750 million from institutional investors, including Princeton University. Thrive has raised several capital funds, including Thrive II, which raised $40 million in 2011, Thrive III, which raised $150 million in 2012, and Thrive IV, which raised $400 million in September 2014.

As an investor in Instagram, Kushner was the second largest investor in Instagram's Series B fundraising round. Valued at $500 million, Thrive soon doubled its money after Instagram was sold to Facebook.

For his work with Thrive, Kushner was named to Forbes 30 Under 30, Inc. Magazine's 35 Under 35, Crain's 40 Under 40, and Vanity Fair's Next Establishment.

In 2021 it was reported by Bloomberg that Goldman Sachs had invested in Kushner's Thrive Capital at a $3.6 billion valuation.

Oscar
Kushner is a co-founder of Oscar Health, a health insurance start-up. Founded in 2012, Oscar was valued at $2.7 billion in 2016. Oscar went public in 2021, with Kushner's Thrive Capital owning a stake worth $1.21 billion. Oscar reported an $87 million loss in its first quarter as a publicly traded company.

In 2020, it was revealed by The Atlantic that Jared Kushner had contracted Oscar Health to develop a coronavirus testing website that was later scrapped, even though Trump had said publicly that Google was developing the website.

Cadre
In 2015, Kushner founded a new company called Cadre with his brother Jared and their friend Ryan Williams, with Williams as Cadre's CEO. Cadre is a technology platform designed to help certain types of client, such as family offices and endowments, invest in real estate.

JK2
Kushner owns 50% of JK2 (also known as Westminster Management), a real estate management company, his brother Jared owns the other 50%. In April 2021, a Judge ruled that JK2 was found to have committed "widespread and numerous" violations of Maryland's consumer protection laws at Baltimore-area properties by collecting debts without the required licenses, charging tenants improper fees, and misrepresenting the condition of rental units.

Kushner's JK2 was also featured in an episode of Netflix's Dirty Money series titled "Slumlord Millionaire." The episode was based on an expose from ProPublica accusing the company of abusing tenants rights, leaving homes in disrepair, humiliating late-paying renters and suing mostly poor immigrants to garnish their wages calling them a "tier-1 predator".

During the COVID-19 pandemic, JK2 filed a significant number of lawsuits against tenants for debt collection and eviction, despite an eviction moratorium being in place.

Personal life
Kushner started dating model Karlie Kloss in 2012. The couple got engaged in July 2018, a month after Kloss' conversion to Judaism (Kushner's faith). The couple married on October 18, 2018. The couple had their first child, a son, in 2021.

His brother, Jared Kushner, is Donald Trump's son-in-law, was his senior advisor during Trump's presidency, and is an investor in Oscar Health.

2017 Saudi Arabia trip and ethics concerns 
According to an investigation by the NYTimes, in late October 2017, Joshua Kushner visited Saudi Arabia and met with several senior members of the Saudi government and the Saudi sovereign wealth fund at a conference in Riyadh. The day after he left Saudi, his brother Jared, and several other senior members of the Trump administration, visited and met with Crown Prince Mohammed Bin Salman. Several ethics experts told The Times, that while the meeting was not illegal, it raised ethical concerns for Joshua and his brother as it was a potential conflict of interest. The Intercept reported in 2018, that after the meeting in October 2017, the Saudi Crown Prince bragged to confidants that Jared Kushner was "in his pocket".

Qatar Kushner Companies 666 Fifth Avenue Investment 
In June 2017, Saudi Arabia and the UAE had implemented a naval blockade on Qatar, accusing them of aiding terrorist groups, and reportedly planned to invade Qatar. During the dispute, Jared had backed the Saudis and Emiratis in the conflict, undermined efforts by then Secretary of State Rex Tillerson to stop the blockade and to bring the conflict to a peaceful outcome, and pressured President Donald Trump to back the Emiratis and Saudis in the dispute, which the President did, according to the NYTimes.

Kushner Companies, a firm that which Joshua serves as Principal Director, during the months prior to the blockage, had attempted to seek financing from the Qataris for their signature 666 Fifth Avenue property, which was facing a massive debt load in April 2017. Joshua's father, Charles Kushner, had met with Qatari finance minister, twice, to seek financing for the property. The deal fell through but ethics concerns were raised by US intelligence officials. Kushner Companies had, through 2015 and 2016, sought an additional $500 million from a Qatari billionaire and former Prime Minister but the deal fell through after Kushner Companies was not able to raise additional funding required for the $500 million investment. During the same week that his father was meeting with the Qatari finance minister in April 2017, Ali Shareef Al Emadi, Josh also met with Al Emadi, and pitched him on investing in Thrive Capital, which Ali Emadi declined. A Qatari source told The Intercept that it would have been “much cheaper” to simply pay Kushner for his failing investment and not suffer the blockade from Saudi/UAE (the blockade ended as soon as Trump left office in January). Tom Barrack, a private equity billionaire and close advisor to President Trump told The Washington Post in 2017 that he had tried to rescue the financing for 666 Fifth Avenue after the investment fell through and had called the former prime minister of Qatar and advised him that he should invest in the project which he still didn't.

See also
Kushner family

References

External links

1985 births
21st-century American businesspeople
American chief executives of financial services companies
American corporate directors
American financiers
American businesspeople in insurance
American investment bankers
American investors
American people of Belarusian-Jewish descent
American real estate businesspeople
American venture capitalists
Businesspeople from New Jersey
Goldman Sachs people
Harvard Business School alumni
Joshua
Living people
People from Livingston, New Jersey
New Jersey Democrats
Harvard College alumni